Change Myself refers to 2010 Japanese album by Iconiq.

It may also refer to:

Music
Change Myself (song), 2010 promotional song for cosmetics commercial by Iconiq
"Change Myself", 1991 single by Todd Rundgren from the album 2nd Wind